Câmpuri is a commune located in Vrancea County, Romania. It is composed of five villages: Câmpuri, Fetești, Gura Văii, Rotileștii Mari, and Rotileștii Mici.

The commune is located in the northern part of the county, on the border with Bacău County. Câmpuri is crossed by the national road  which connects it to the west to Soveja and Tulnici and to the southeast to Răcoasa, Străoane, Panciu, and Mărășești (where it ends in DN2).

In July 1917, part of the Battle of Mărăști was fought in this area.

Natives
Gina Gogean (born 1977), artistic gymnast 
Ion Roată (1806–1882), peasant and political figure; he was born in Câmpuri and died in Gura Văii

References

Communes in Vrancea County
Localities in Western Moldavia